Nalawort railway station was located on the Adelaide-Wolseley line serving what is now the Adelaide Hills suburb of Crafers West. It was located 28.0 kilometres from Adelaide station.

History 

Nalawort was opened in the 1920s as a stopping place for rail motors, suggesting it was opened when the Brill Model 75 class railcars entered service.  The station closed on 12 December 1945. There is a clearing on the southern side of the line where the platform once stood. The only other remnants of the station are a set of steps, which lead to the station from the Long Gully substation next to Princes Avenue.

References

Disused railway stations in South Australia
Railway stations closed in 1945